Falling Waters is a census-designated place in West Virginia.

Falling Waters may also refer to:
Battle of Falling Waters (1861), or the Battle of Hoke's Run, occurring July 2, 1861 near Falling Waters, Virginia (now West Virginia)
Battle of Falling Waters (1863), or the Battle of Williamsport, occurring July 6–16, 1863 near Williamsport, Maryland
Falling Waters State Park, near Chipley, Florida

See also
Falling Water (disambiguation)